Singapore Mass Rapid Transit may refer to:

 Mass Rapid Transit (Singapore), the Mass Rapid Transit system in Singapore
 SBS Transit, the company that operates the North East Line, the Senkang and Punggol LRT and the future Downtown Line of Singapore's Mass Rapid Transit system
 SMRT Corporation, the company that operates the East West Line, North South Line, Circle Line and the Bukit Panjang LRT of Singapore's Mass Rapid Transit system